NCSTL may refer to:

 Nashville, Chattanooga and St. Louis Railway
 National Clearinghouse for Science, Technology and the Law